Clerodendrum tomentosum, known as the downy chance, hairy lolly bush, hairy clairy or hairy clerodendrum  is a shrub or small tree occurring in eastern and northern Australia. Distributed from Batemans Bay (35° S) in southern coastal New South Wales, Queensland, Northern Territory, Western Australia, and New Guinea.

The habitat is the margins of warmer rainforests of various types. It can survive in certain areas of under 1000 mm average annual rainfall.

Name and taxonomy 
The curious common name of "downy chance" alludes to both the generic and species names. The generic name Clerodendrum was coined by the father of modern taxonomy, Carl Linnaeus. Clerodendrum is from the Greek, literally meaning "allotment tree" ("clero" being allotment and "dendros", tree) while "tomentosum" refers to downy or hairy leaves.  Recent phylogenetic studies have shown that the genus Clerodendrum belongs in the mint family. Consequently, this species has been removed from the verbena family and placed in Lamiaceae.

Description 
Up to 15 metres tall with a trunk diameter of 25 cm, though usually much smaller. An opened branched plant with large veiny leaves.

The trunk is mostly cylindrical or sometimes flanged at the base. Bark is grey or fawn, somewhat scaly or corky on larger plants. Young branchlets have lenticels, and are downy and soft. Angled or square in cross section, brownish grey and sometimes purple at the tips.

Leaves 
Opposite on the stem, without serrations, 4 to 14 cm long, 2 to 4.5 cm wide. With a short tip, leaf form gradually tapering away at the base of the leaf. Upper leaf surface sometimes hairy. Hairy under the leaf, soft and downy to touch. Pale green below the leaf, darker above. Leaf veins prominent on the underside, visible on the top surface. 5 or 6 main lateral veins, curving near the leaf edge.

Flowers and fruit 
White flowers form in dense heads between the months of October to January. In the form of cymes forming terminal corymbs. Four long stamens protrude from the fragrant flower.

The fruit is a black shiny or navy blue drupe with four lobes. Surrounded by a fleshy red calyx. The red and black of the fruiting body attracts birds, such as the satin bowerbird. Drupe size is 5 to 8 mm, the width of the red calyx is up to 20 mm. Flowers are pollinated by nocturnal moths. The fruit is not edible for humans.

Slow to regenerate from seed, though it can strike from cuttings.

Uses 
The attractive flowers and fruit make this suitable to native gardens in Australia. A bird and butterfly attracting plant. A pioneer species in regeneration areas.

References 

Ornamental trees
Flora of New Guinea
Flora of Queensland
tomentosum
Trees of Australia
Plants described in 1805
Taxa named by Robert Brown (botanist, born 1773)